Pogeez is a municipality in the district of Lauenburg, in Schleswig-Holstein, Germany. It is located south of the city of Lübeck, on the western bank of Ratzeburger See.

References

Municipalities in Schleswig-Holstein
Herzogtum Lauenburg